Orbita may refer to:
Orbita (TV system), a Soviet-Russian system of broadcasting and delivering TV signals via satellites.
Orbita, Ávila, a municipality located in the province of Ávila, Castile and León, Spain.
Orbita, Cherkasy Oblast, closed city in Ukraine
Orbita (collective), a Latvian art collective.